Clive Frederick Davey, born at North Petherton, Somerset on 2 June 1932, was a cricketer who played in 13 first-class matches for Somerset split between the 1953 and 1955 cricket seasons.

Davey was a right-handed middle-order batsman, though in the mobile Somerset batting order of the early 1950s he often batted at No 8 or even No 9. It was at No 9 that he made his debut in the match against Kent at Bath in June 1953. He played in seven further matches that summer, never making more than 30 runs, and never coming in higher than No 6.

Not appearing in 1954, he returned in 1955, and was more successful immediately. On his return to the team, again at Bath, this time against Leicestershire, he made 46, batting at No 5 in the first innings. But this was the highest score of his career: he failed to maintain this form and he turned down the option of a one-year extension to his contract at the end of the season. He did not bowl in first-class cricket.

References

External links
 

1932 births
English cricketers
Somerset cricketers
Living people